Phosphinane is the organophosphorus compound with the formula (CH2)5PH.  This colorless liquid is the parent member of a family of six-membered, saturated rings containing phosphorus.  These compounds are mainly of academic interest. The ring adopts a flexible cyclohexane-like chair conformation.

Phosphinane can be prepared via the Arbuzov reaction of triethylphosphite and 1,5-dibromopentane followed by cyclization and reduction steps. Phosphinane can also be prepared by reduction of 1-chlorophosphinane, which in turn is obtained by the reaction of 1-phenylphosphinane and phosphorus trichloride.

References

Phosphorus heterocycles
Six-membered rings